Iveta Benešová and Barbora Záhlavová-Strýcová were the defending champions, but decided not to participate.
Andrea Hlaváčková and Lucie Hradecká won the final 6–3, 6–4 against Irina-Camelia Begu and Monica Niculescu.

Seeds

Draw

Draw

References
 Main Draw

2012 Doubles
BGL Luxembourg Open - Doubles
2012 in Luxembourgian tennis